wake is the second album released from the band emmet swimming. This album was released twice; first as an independent release and later as an Epic Records release. The 1994 Screaming Goddess Music release differs from the Epic Records re-release of wake. The 1994 release included the song "I Believe" and has a varied track sequence. The song "Boones Farm Wine" is re-titled "I'll Be Fine" on the Epic Records re-release of wake. The 1995 Epic Records release added the songs "Jump In The Water" and "Ed's Song." The song "Broken Oar" also differs with a new production of the song.

Track listing (1994 Screaming Goddess release)

Track listing (1995 Epic release)

Awards

Personnel
Todd Watts - Vocals, Guitar
Erik Wenberg	- Guitar, backing vocals
Robert Shaw - Bass
Tamer Eid - Drums
Marco Delmar - Engineer
Steve Boyer (1995 Epic Release Tracks 1,3 and 8) - Engineer
David Amoroso - Cover Art/Photography

References

Emmet Swimming albums
1994 albums
1995 albums